Wattle Flat is a small town in rural Shire of Hepburn in Victoria, Australia.

References 

Towns in Victoria (Australia)